David A. Score is a former rear admiral in the National Oceanic and Atmospheric Administration Commissioned Officer Corps who last served as Director, NOAA Commissioned Officer Corps and Director, NOAA Office of Marine and Aviation Operations. He retired from the NOAA Corps on September 6, 2017, after over 27 years of service.

Early life and education 
Score graduated in 1990 from Florida Institute of Technology in Melbourne, Florida.

Career
Score was commissioned as an officer in the NOAA Commissioned Officers Corps in 1990. During his sea service Score served from the Caribbean Sea to the Bering Sea. Score is an accomplished diver and dive master, having supervised more than 2,000 dives. Score also served in a variety of management and operational roles at Channel Islands, Gray's Reef National Marine Sanctuary, and Florida Keys National Marine Sanctuary. He served as the superintendent of Florida Keys National Marine Sanctuary. In 1999, Score was the NOAA Association of Commissioned Officers' Junior Officer of the Year.

Score served as deputy director prior to his appointment as Director, NOAA Commissioned Officer Corps and NOAA Office of Marine and Aviation Operations beginning January 2, 2014. Prior to that assignment, he oversaw all NOAA ship fleet operations as the Director of the Office of Marine and Aviation Operations Operations Center.

Awards and decorations
Score received the following awards:

 NOAA Deck Officer Badge
 NOAA Command at Sea Badge

References

Florida Institute of Technology alumni
Living people
National Oceanic and Atmospheric Administration Commissioned Officer Corps admirals
Recipients of the Department of Commerce Bronze Medal
Year of birth missing (living people)